Hibiscus clayi, common names red Kauai rosemallow, Clay's hibiscus or Kokiʻo ʻula (Hawaiian name), is a perennial angiosperm of the mallow family Malvaceae.

Etymology
The generic name is derived from the Greek word ἱβίσκος (hibískos), which was the name Pedanius Dioscorides (ca. 40–90) gave to Althaea officinalis. The species name clayi honors Horace F. Clay, a horticulturalist of Hawaii.

Description
Leaves are medium green, shiny, smooth-edged or slightly toothed on the tip. Single flowers are borne at the ends of the branches. They are showy, bright or dark red and they bloom all year around. They are generally similar to Hibiscus kokio. This plant is listed as endangered by USFWS.

Distribution and habitat
This plant is endemic to Hawaii. The conservation status of H. clayi is listed as Critically Endangered on the IUCN Red List.

See also
Hawaiian hibiscus

References 

clayi
Endemic flora of Hawaii
Plants described in 1959